Cocoanut Grove is a 1938 American comedy film directed by Alfred Santell, and written by Sy Bartlett and Olive Cooper. The film stars Fred MacMurray, Harriet Hilliard, Ben Blue, Eve Arden, Rufe Davis, Billy Lee and George Walcott. The film was released on May 20, 1938, by Paramount Pictures.

Plot
Johnny Prentice, a bandleader in Chicago with a bad temper, alienates some of his musicians and is in danger of losing custody of Half Pint, his son. He hires Linda Rogers to be the boy's tutor.

After being encouraged by Linda to pursue his dream of playing at the Cocoanut Grove nightclub in Los Angeles, they pack up friend Dixie's new trailer and head west. At a trailer park, they run into Hula Harry and hear a song he's composed. To his amazement, Johnny discovers that not only is Harry very talented, Linda is, too.

The trailer breaks down in Kansas, but the good news is that garage owner Bibb Tucker is a talented fellow as well. He is invited to tag along. When the group reaches L.A., the club date has mistakenly gone to another band. Worse yet, Johnny's apparent flirtation with Hazel De Vore leads to Linda boarding a bus and leaving for home.

Discovering the mistake, Johnny's musicians take matters into their own hands and keep the other band captive, Johnny goes after Linda and gets her back in time for that night's show.

Cast
Fred MacMurray as Johnny Prentice
Harriet Hilliard as Linda Rogers
Ben Blue as Joe De Lemma
Eve Arden as Sophie De Lemma
Rufe Davis as Bibb Tucker
Billy Lee as Half Pint
George Walcott as Tony Wonder
Virginia Vale as Hazel De Vore
Red Stanley as Dixie
Harry Owens as Hula Harry
Ellen Drew as Radio Station Receptionist
Randy Oness as Band Singer
Harry Owens and His Royal Hawaiians as Royal Hawaiian Orchestra
The Yacht Club Boys as Singing Quartette

References

External links 
 

1938 films
1930s English-language films
American comedy films
1938 comedy films
Paramount Pictures films
Films directed by Alfred Santell
American black-and-white films
1930s American films